This was the first edition of the event.

Peter Lundgren won the title, defeating John Ross 6–7, 7–5, 6–3 in the final.

Seeds

  Tarik Benhabiles (first round)
  Andrei Chesnokov (second round)
  Ramesh Krishnan (semifinals)
  Thomas Muster (quarterfinals)
  Jaime Yzaga (first round)
  Dan Goldie (second round)
  Matt Anger (first round)
  Jim Pugh (second round)

Draw

Finals

Top half

Bottom half

References

 Main Draw

Rye Brook Open
1987 Grand Prix (tennis)